Joseph Gardner (1752–1794) was an American physician who was a delegate for Pennsylvania to the Continental Congress in 1784 and 1785.

Joseph was born in Honey Brook Township of Chester County, Pennsylvania in 1752. He studied medicine and practiced in Philadelphia.

In 1776 Gardner raised and commanded the Fourth Battalion of militia in Chester County. He also served on the county's Committee of Safety in 1776-1777, and as a representative in the Pennsylvania state assembly from 1776 to 1778. In 1779, he was member of the state's supreme executive council. Pennsylvania sent him as a delegate to the Continental Congress twice, in 1784 and 1785. Throughout this time, he continued the practice of medicine.

Gardner moved to Elkton, Maryland in 1792, and also practiced as a physician. He died at Elkton in Cecil County, Maryland in 1794. Joseph was married to Isabel Cochran (1747–1794), but there is no record of any children.

External links
Gardner’s biographic note on U.S. Congress website

1752 births
1794 deaths
Continental Congressmen from Pennsylvania
18th-century American politicians
People from Chester County, Pennsylvania
Physicians from Pennsylvania
Physicians from Maryland
People from Cecil County, Maryland